Limestone Creek is a river in Mitchell County and Jewell County in the U.S. State of Kansas. Limestone Creek flows into the Solomon River.

References

Rivers of Kansas
Rivers of Jewell County, Kansas